Sabrina Jaquet (born 21 June 1987) is a former Swiss badminton player. She won a bronze medal at the 2017 European Championships. Jaquet competed at the 2012, 2016 and 2020 Summer Olympics. Jaquet retired after the 2020 Olympics.

Achievements

European Championships 

Women's singles

BWF Grand Prix (1 runner-up) 

The BWF Grand Prix had two levels, the Grand Prix and Grand Prix Gold. It was a series of badminton tournaments sanctioned by the Badminton World Federation (BWF) and played between 2007 and 2017.

Women's singles

 BWF Grand Prix Gold tournament
 BWF Grand Prix tournament

BWF International Challenge/Series (3 titles, 7 runners-up) 
Women's singles

Women's doubles

Mixed doubles

 BWF International Challenge tournament
 BWF International Series tournament
 BWF Future Series tournament

References

External links
 
 
 

1987 births
Living people
People from La Chaux-de-Fonds
Swiss female badminton players
Badminton players at the 2012 Summer Olympics
Badminton players at the 2016 Summer Olympics
Badminton players at the 2020 Summer Olympics
Olympic badminton players of Switzerland
Badminton players at the 2019 European Games
European Games competitors for Switzerland
Sportspeople from the canton of Neuchâtel
21st-century Swiss women